Santa Fe Abbey is a former Cistercian monastery in Zaragoza, Aragon, Spain. It was established on this site in 1341 or 1343, as a resettlement of the original Cistercian foundation of Fuente Clara Abbey, a daughter house of Abbaye de Bonnefont, of 1223, which was obliged to move here from its original site in Alcolea de Cinca in Aragon because of banditry. 

The monastery was dissolved either in 1808 or in 1835–37. There are no visible remains of the monastic buildings. The large domed church still on the site was built in the late 18th century (completed 1788).

Notes

External links

Website of the Friends' Association of Santa Fe Abbey 
Certosa di Firenze: Santa Fe 
Certosa di Firenze: photos of the abbey site by Stephen Tobin 

Buildings and structures completed in 1343
Cistercian monasteries in Spain
Monasteries in Aragon
1341 establishments in Europe
History of Zaragoza
14th-century establishments in Spain